The second running of the Miss Earth India beauty pageant was held in September 2016. The winner represented India at the Miss Earth 2016 competition.

Final results

Finalists

Crossovers

 Bavyata Sharma
 Ru-Ba-Ru Miss India Elite 2014 - (Winner)
 Supermodel International 2014 - (Semifinalist)
 Campus Princess 2014 - (Finalist)
Rashi Yadav
 Miss Diva - 2015

References

Miss Earth India
2016 in India
2016 beauty pageants